Borki Wielbarskie  is a village in the administrative district of Gmina Wielbark, within Szczytno County, Warmian-Masurian Voivodeship, in northern Poland.
The village has an approximate population of 70.

References

Borki Wielbarskie